Rayners is a Grade II listed public house at 23 Village Way East, Rayners Lane, Harrow, London HA2 7LX.

It was built in 1937 for Truman's Brewery, and designed by the architects Eedle and Meyers.

It was Grade II listed in 2006 by Historic England. It has been empty since 2006.

See also
 List of pubs in London

References

Pubs in the London Borough of Harrow
Grade II listed pubs in London
Grade II listed buildings in the London Borough of Harrow
Former pubs in London